The Lolo Hotshots are a specialist Interagency Hotshot Crew based out of the Lolo National Forest in west-central Montana.  The crew consists of 21 permanent and seasonal wildland firefighters.

History 
The Lolo Hotshots were founded in 1961 and are considered to be one of the first hotshot crews in the United States. The Lolo Hotshots received their first dispatch in 1969 to fight the Russian River Fire in Alaska. In 1989, Margaret Doherty was hired as the Lolo Hotshots' Superintendent, becoming the first ever female hotshot superintendent.

Organization 
Today, the crew consists of 1 superintendent, 1 assistant superintendent, 3 squad leaders, 6 senior fire firefighters and 10 temporary employees.

Operations 
The Lolo Hotshots focus primarily on wildfire suppression and management.  The crew's wildfire season typically starts in mid-April and ends in early to mid-October. Crewmembers are expected to be in excellent physical condition and must meet the Standards for Interagency Hotshot Crew Operations. The Lolo Hotshots are deployable anywhere in the United States and have been dispatched to Canada and Brazil to assist in wildfire suppression.

Incidents 
On August 13, 2016, firefighter Justin Randal Beebe was killed while falling a hazard tree on the Strawberry Fire in Great Basin National Park, Nevada.

See also 

 Hotshot crew
 Wildfire suppression

References 

Wildfire suppression
Forestry in the United States
Firefighting in the United States
American firefighters
Wildfire suppression agencies
Lolo National Forest